This is a list of architectural firms based in Denmark. For a list of individual Danish architects, see the list of Danish architects.

List

Active

Defunct

See also
 List of Danish architects

References